

Winners

See also 

National Film Awards

References

External links
 Kerala Chalachitra Academy (Motion Picture Academy of Kerala State)

Kerala State Film Awards
2011 Indian film awards